Seun Babalola Bamiro is a Nigerian fashion entrepreneur and chief executive officer at Ynorth Wears, an ingenious Nigerian fashion company and one of the biggest producer of made in Nigeria wears.

References 

Living people
Date of birth missing (living people)
Year of birth missing (living people)
Nigerian chief executives
Nigerian businesspeople
21st-century Nigerian businesspeople
Nigerian company founders